Silvia Oliva Fragoso (born 8 November 1947) is a Mexican politician affiliated with the Party of the Democratic Revolution. As of 2014 she served as Deputy of the LVII and LX Legislatures of the Mexican Congress representing the Federal District.

References

1947 births
Living people
Politicians from Mexico City
Women members of the Chamber of Deputies (Mexico)
Party of the Democratic Revolution politicians
21st-century Mexican politicians
21st-century Mexican women politicians
Deputies of the LX Legislature of Mexico
Members of the Chamber of Deputies (Mexico) for Mexico City